Erica mammosa, the nine-pin heath, is a species of flowering plant in the family Ericaceae, that is naturally restricted to the south-western corner of the Western Cape, South Africa.

The species name mammosa means "with breasts" and refers to the udder-like tubular shape of the flowers.

This plant is found as an ornamental garden subject.
In the UK it has gained the Royal Horticultural Society’s Award of Garden Merit. Like many heathers it is a calcifuge, meaning that it must be grown in an acidic soil. It requires a sunny, sheltered spot with sharp drainage.

Gallery

References

mammosa
Endemic flora of South Africa
Flora of the Cape Provinces
Fynbos
Taxa named by Carl Linnaeus